The Dmitriy Furmanov is a Dmitriy Furmanov-class (project 302, BiFa129M) Soviet/Russian river cruise ship, cruising in the Volga – Neva basin. The ship was built by VEB Elbewerften Boizenburg/Roßlau at their shipyard in Boizenburg, East Germany, and entered service in 1983. The ship is named after the famous Bolshevik commissar and writer of the book Chapayev about Vasily Chapayev, a Red Army officer and a hero of the Civil War.

Her home port is currently Perm. Dmitriy Furmanov captain (2013) is Aleksandr Kozminykh.

Features
The ship has two restaurants, three bars, the lounge on the Upper deck, conference hall and souvenir shop.

See also
 List of river cruise ships
 Ukraina-class motorship

References

External links

Теплоход "Дмитрий Фурманов" 

1983 ships
River cruise ships